Kirovo-Chepetsk is a town in Kirov Oblast, Russia, located at the confluence of the Cheptsa and the Vyatka Rivers,  east of Kirov. Population:

Geography
The 50th eastern meridian runs exactly through the town.

History
It was founded in the mid-15th century as the village of Ust-Cheptsa. Town status was granted to it in 1955.

In 1954, an ice hockey team called “Khimik” ("Chemist") was founded in the city. In 1964, the team was named Olimpiya Kirovo-Chepetsk. Famous pupils of the team: Alexander Maltsev, Vladimir Myshkin, Andrey Trefilov.

Administrative and municipal status
Within the framework of administrative divisions, Kirovo-Chepetsk serves as the administrative center of Kirovo-Chepetsky District, even though it is not a part of it. As an administrative division, it is incorporated separately as the Town of Kirovo-Chepetsk—an administrative unit with the status equal to that of the districts. As a municipal division, the Town of Kirovo-Chepetsk is incorporated as Kirovo-Chepetsk Urban Okrug.

Notable people
 Former Soviet national hockey team players Vladimir Myshkin and Alexander Maltsev
 Yury Patrikeyev, Olympic bronze medalist and European champion in wrestling representing Armenia.

References

Notes

Sources

External links

Official website of Kirovo-Chepetsk 
Kirovo-Chepetsk Business Directory kirovo-chepetsk.jsprav.ru 
Unofficial website of Kirovo-Chepetsk 

Cities and towns in Kirov Oblast